Antonine Maillet,  (born May 10, 1929) is an Acadian novelist, playwright, and scholar. She was born in Bouctouche, New Brunswick, Canada.

Education 
Following high school, Maillet received her BA from the Collège Notre-Dame d'Acadie in 1950, followed by an MA from the Université de Moncton in 1959. She then received her PhD in literature in 1971 from the Université Laval. Her thesis is entitled Rabelais et les traditions populaires en Acadie.

Career 
Maillet taught literature and folklore at the college Notre-Dame d'Acadie (1954-1960); at the University of Moncton (1965-1967); at the Collège des Jésuites de Québec (1968-1969); at the Université Laval (1971-1974); then at the Université de Montréal between (1974-1975). She later worked for Radio-Canada in Moncton as a scriptwriter and host. In 1988 Maillet hosted the French-language Leaders' Debate for Radio-Canada TV between Prime Minister Brian Mulroney, Liberal Party of Canada Leader John Turner, and New Democratic Party leader Ed Broadbent. From 1989 to 2000, she served as chancellor of the Université de Moncton.

In 1976 she was made an Officer of the Order of Canada and was promoted to Companion in 1981. Maillet was awarded the Royal Society of Canada's Lorne Pierce Medal in 1980. In 1985 she was made an Officier des Arts et des Lettres de France and in 2005 she was inducted into the Order of New Brunswick. She is a member of the Queen's Privy Council for Canada since 1 July 1992. This gives her the right to the honorific prefix "The Honourable" and the Post Nominal Letters  "PC" for Life. In 1979 her work Pélagie-la-Charrette won the Prix Goncourt, making her the first non-European recipient. In 1994, the College Militaire Royal theatre group performed in a play by Maillet both at CMR and at Royal Military College of Canada. Maillet was granted an Honorary Degree from RMC in 1995.

Selected works 
Pointe-aux-Coques - 1958
On a mangé la dune - 1962
Les Crasseux - 1968
La Sagouine - 1971
Rabelais et les traditions populaires en Acadie - 1971 
Don l'Orignal - 1972 (winner of the (1972 Governor General's Award for Fiction)
Par derrière chez mon père - 1972
Gapi et Sullivan - 1973
L'Acadie pour quasiment rien - 1973
Mariaagélas - 1973
Évangéline Deusse - 1975
Gapi - 1976
La veuve enragée - 1977
Les Cordes-de-bois - 1977
Le Bourgeois Gentleman - 1978
Pélagie-la-Charrette - 1979 (winner of the Prix Goncourt)
Cent ans dans les bois - 1981
Christophe Cartier de la Noisette dit Nounours, conte jeunesse illustré par Hans TroxlerLa Contrebandière - 1981Les drolatiques, horrifiques et épouvantables aventures de Panurge, ami de Pantagruel - 1981La Gribouille - 1982Crache à pic - 1984Garrochés en paradis - 1986Le Huitième Jour - 1986Margot la folle - 1987L'oursiade - 1990William S. - 1991 Les confessions de Jeanne de Valois - 1992La nuit des rois - 1993La Fontaine ou la Comédie des Animaux - 1995 Le Chemin Saint-Jacques - 1996L'Île-aux-Puces - 1996Chronique d'une sorcière de vent 1999Madame Perfecta - 2002Le temps me dure - 2003Pierre Bleu - 2006Le Mystérieux Voyage de Rien - 2009Fais confiance à la mer, elle te portera'' - 2010

See also 
List of French Canadian writers from outside Quebec
List of Quebec authors

References

External links
Antonine Maillet Profile at Government of Canada
CBC Digital Archives – Antonine Maillet, Acadian Avenger
La Sagouine, Acadian tourist attraction
 Antonine Maillet - The Possibilities Are Endless (Trailer), National Film Board of Canada
Antonine Maillet, Novelist  - Cover story, Atlantic Insight Magazine, July 1980

1929 births
Living people
Acadian people
Canadian women dramatists and playwrights
20th-century Canadian novelists
Companions of the Order of Canada
Fellows of the Royal Society of Canada
Governor General's Award-winning fiction writers
Members of the Order of New Brunswick
Members of the King's Privy Council for Canada
Officers of the National Order of Quebec
Officiers of the Ordre des Arts et des Lettres
People from Bouctouche
Prix Goncourt winners
Université Laval alumni
Writers from Moncton
Canadian women novelists
20th-century Canadian dramatists and playwrights
21st-century Canadian dramatists and playwrights
20th-century Canadian women writers
21st-century Canadian women writers
Canadian novelists in French
Canadian dramatists and playwrights in French